Rita Azevedo Gomes (born in 1952) is a Portuguese filmmaker.

Filmography 
 O Som da Terra a Tremer (1990)
 O cinema vai ao teatro (1996)
 King Arthur (1996) 
 Intromissoes (1998)
 25 de abril (1999)
 Fragile as the World (2001)
 A 15ª pedra - Manoel de Oliveira e João Bénard da Costa em conversa filmada (2007)
 A coleççao invisivel (2008)
 A Woman's Revenge (2012)
 Correspondências (2016)
 A Portuguesa (2018)

Awards 
Best director at the Angra do Heroísmo international film festival for Altar. A Portuguesa won the Golden Lady Harimaguada at Las Palmas de Gran Canaria International Film Festival, 2019.

References

External links

Portuguese film directors
Portuguese women film directors
1952 births
Living people